Sheena Patricia Camille Quiambao Prats–Yambao, (born June 20, 1985), known professionally as Camile Prats, is a Filipino actress, TV host, comedienne, and businesswoman. Recognized as the original "Princess of Drama", she has starred in a series of successful films and television shows, gaining media attention when she played the titular protagonist in Sarah... Ang Munting Prinsesa (Philippine adaptation to A Little Princess).

Career
Prats' first foray into show business came in 1990 when she was a contestant in "Little Miss Philippines", a popular segment of the variety show Eat Bulaga!. This led to her regular appearances in ABS-CBN's children's program Ang TV. In 1993, she was also included as one of the casts of sitcom Oki Doki Doc.

In 1995, Prats catapulted into fame when she starred in the movie Sarah... Ang Munting Prinsesa, a Philippine adaptation of the anime Princess Sarah, which was in turn based on Frances Hodgson Burnett children's novel A Little Princess. She also became one of the lead casts of defunct ABS-CBN afternoon soap opera Marinella together with then child stars Shaina Magdayao and Serena Dalrymple. Prats was also chosen to be one of the lead casts of defunct youth-oriented show G-mik and she was paired with Stefano Mori and Danilo Barrios. Her older brother, John Prats, is also included as one of the lead casts of that show.

In early 2000s, Prats also became part of several ABS-CBN sitcoms like Arriba, Arriba! (2000-2002) and Home Along Da Airport (2003-2004). She played her first villain role in the first Philippine action-drama soap opera Basta't Kasama Kita starring Judy Ann Santos and Robin Padilla. However, she left ABS-CBN and Star Magic in 2004.

In 2005, she transferred to rival network, GMA Network. She starred in her first Kapuso teleserye, Kung Mamahalin Mo Lang Ako and played more supporting roles in different GMA soap operas.

In 2009, she was allowed to be part of the horror film T2 distributed by Star Cinema under ABS-CBN film and also recently invited in Kapamilya Deal or No Deal, also seen on ABS-CBN. But she confirmed via PEP.com that she will remain a GMA contract actress.

Prats also is one of the final hosts of Kapuso talk show, Mars Pa More.

Personal life
Like her brother, young TV actress Camille Prats decided to go to the United States in September 2007 to finish her studies.

Anthony C. Linsangan, from AMA Makati and founder of Wheels Auto Performance, is the actual father of Camille's baby. Prats confirmed her civil marriage with Anthony Linsangan on January 5, 2008, in Los Angeles, California at The Albertson Wedding Chapel.

On January 24, 2008, Prats gave birth to her first child, Nathaniel Caesar P. Linsangan.

Camille Prats is the second child of Daniel Rafael and Alma (née Quiambao) Prats, the latter of whom is from Pampanga. She is also the niece of former actress Mia Prats. She has a sister and three brothers, one of whom is fellow actor John Prats.

On September 23, 2011, her first husband, Anthony Linsangan, died of nasopharyngeal carcinoma at the age of 31. On January 7, 2017, Prats married businessman John Yambao in Batangas. On February 1, 2017, she confirmed in an interview that she is expecting her second child.

Filmography

Television

Movies

Awards

Film awards and nominations

TV awards and nominations

References

External links
Camille Prats Biography on dPinoyWeb.com

Camille Prats at the ABS-CBN Talent Center website
Sparkle profile at the GMA Network website

1985 births
Living people
Filipino television actresses
Filipino child actresses
Filipino people of American descent
Filipino film actresses
Star Magic
Filipino women comedians
ABS-CBN personalities
GMA Network personalities
Kapampangan people